Homonota rupicola is a species of gecko. It is endemic to Paraguay.

References

Homonota
Reptiles of Paraguay
Endemic fauna of Paraguay
Reptiles described in 2007